Horse trade may refer to: 
Horse Trade Theater Group
Horse trading